Winchcombe is a town in Gloucestershire, England.

Winchcombe may also refer to:
John Winchcombe (disambiguation)
Frederick Winchcombe (1855–1917), Australian businessman and politician
Winchcombe baronets, County of Berkshire, England

See also
 
 Winchcombeshire, ancient English county